Secrets of the Castle, or Secrets of the Castle with Ruth, Peter and Tom is a British factual television series that first broadcast on BBC Two from 18 November to 17 December 2014. The series stars archaeologists Peter Ginn and Tom Pinfold, and historian Ruth Goodman. In the series, the team takes part in the medieval construction project at Guédelon Castle in Treigny, France. During their stay there, they reveal what kind of skills and crafts were needed to build a castle in the 13th century, by using the techniques, tools and materials of the era.

Location
The castle construction site shown in the series is Guédelon Castle in France, a 25-year experimental archaeology project where a castle is being built using only the techniques, tools and materials from the Middle Ages, ie. without electricity or modern power tools.

Episode list

See also
 BBC historic farm series
 Tales from the Green Valley
 Victorian Farm
 Edwardian Farm
 Wartime Farm
 Tudor Monastery Farm
 Victorian Pharmacy

References

External links
 

2014 British television series debuts
2014 British television series endings
2010s British documentary television series
Television series by All3Media
English-language television shows
Medieval reenactment
Historical reality television series
BBC historic farm series
BBC television documentaries about medieval history